Lake Helen 53A is a First Nations reserve in Thunder Bay District, Ontario, Canada. It is one of two reserves for the Red Rock Indian Band.

References

Ojibwe reserves in Ontario
Communities in Thunder Bay District